Mejametalana Airport  is a military airport in Maseru, the capital city of Lesotho.

Facilities 

References

External links

 

Airports in Lesotho
Buildings and structures in Maseru
Military of Lesotho